Iolaus gemmarius, the small jewel sapphire, is a butterfly in the family Lycaenidae. The species was first described by Hamilton Herbert Druce in 1910. It is found in Nigeria (south and the Cross River loop) and Cameroon. The habitat consists of forests.

References

External links

 Die Gross-Schmetterlinge der Erde 13: Die Afrikanischen Tagfalter. Plate XIII 68 d

Butterflies described in 1910
Iolaus (butterfly)